The North Eastern Railway Dynamometer Car is a preserved railway dynamometer car. Built in 1906 by the North Eastern Railway (NER) at Darlington Works, its role was to scientifically measure the performance of trains in order to effect improvements.

In 1923 it was included in the acquisition of the NER by the LNER, and used extensively by Chief Engineer Nigel Gresley. In 1938 it was used to record world record high speed runs on the East Coast Main Line behind 4468 Mallard. It was used in the 1948 Locomotive Exchange Trials by British Railways.

Part of the National Collection, it is preserved at the National Railway Museum in York.

References

Dynamometers
North Eastern Railway (UK)